Harai Goshi Gaeshi (払腰返) is a hip sweep counter in judo.  It is one of the techniques adopted later by the Kodokan into their Shinmeisho No Waza (newly accepted techniques) list.   It is categorized as a foot technique, Ashi-waza.

Description 
Uke attacks Tori with right harai goshi, as he does so Tori counters by hooking his left leg around Uke's lower left leg and reaps it to the right.

See also
The Canon Of Judo
 Similar to hane goshi gaeshi, the counter to the spring hip throw

References

Judo technique
Throw (grappling)
Grappling hold
Grappling positions
Martial art techniques